Raojia (autonym:  or ) is a Hmongic language spoken by about 5,000 people in 3 villages (including Baixing 白兴村) of Heba Township 河坝乡, Majiang County, Guizhou. 

Raojia belongs to the Qiandong Miao (East Hmongic) branch (Li Yunbing 2000; Chen Qiguang 2013).

References

External links 
 Raojia numerals

Hmongic languages
Languages of China